is a Japanese football player.

Playing career
Sano was born in Shizuoka on April 22, 1982. After graduating from Shimizu Commercial High School, he joined J1 League club Tokyo Verdy with team mate Daigo Kobayashi in 2001. Although he debuted in 2002, he could not play many matches for injury. In 2004, he moved to J2 League club Shonan Bellmare. He played many matches in 2 seasons. In 2006, he moved to Regional Leagues club V-Varen Nagasaki. He played many matches and scored many goals in 2 seasons. In 2008, he moved to Japan Football League club New Wave Kitakyushu (later Giravanz Kitakyushu). He became a regular player and the club was promoted to J2 from 2010. Although he played many matches until 2010, he could hardly play in the match in 2011. In July 2011, he moved to Regional Leagues club SC Sagamihara. He became a regular player and the club was promoted to JFL from 2013 and J3 League from 2014. In 2015, he moved to JFL club Maruyasu Okazaki. In 2018, he moved to Regional Leagues club J.FC Miyazaki.

Club statistics

References

External links

1982 births
Living people
Association football people from Shizuoka Prefecture
Japanese footballers
J1 League players
J2 League players
Japan Football League players
Tokyo Verdy players
Shonan Bellmare players
V-Varen Nagasaki players
Giravanz Kitakyushu players
SC Sagamihara players
FC Maruyasu Okazaki players
Association football midfielders